Marshall Cavendish is a subsidiary company of Times Publishing Group, the printing and publishing subsidiary of Singapore-based conglomerate Fraser and Neave (which in turn currently owned by ThaiBev, the beverage company in Thailand), and at present is a publisher of books, business directories and magazines. Marshall Cavendish was established in the United Kingdom in 1968 by Norman Marshall (1921-1975)and Patrick Cavendish (1939-2000). Times Publishing Group acquired it in 1980.

In 2011, Amazon Publishing acquired over 450 titles of Marshall Cavendish's US Children's trade books business, Marshall Cavendish Children's Books (MCCB). In 2013, Roger Rosen of Rosen Publishing acquired the Marshall Cavendish's US Children's library books business.

Books
 How It Works (later reprinted and updated by H. S. Stuttman Co., Inc.for the US, titled The Illustrated Science and Invention Encyclopedia)

Magazines, partworks 
 Science Spy
Young Generation (YG)
 Story of Life - published in 105 weekly parts - 1970 - 75 cents per magazine
 History of the Second World War - published in 96 weekly parts - 1973 - 95 cents a magazine
 Murder Casebook - published in 153 weekly parts - 1989
 Great Artists - 96 parts - first published 1985
 Great Composers and Their Music - 63 parts - first published 1985
 Times Past - 102 parts - published 1987
 Man and Woman - 1970 - 1976
 Discovery: Travel back in time and bring the past back to life - (UK) Fortnightly history magazine for older children.
 The Ancestral Trail - (UK) 1992-1994 Fortnightly fantasy/science fiction magazine for children

Directories
 Singapore Banking & Financial Services Directory 
 Singapore Convention & Exhibition Directory 
 Singapore Agri-Food Business Directory
 Directory of Certified Companies in Singapore
 Singapore Biotech Guide
 Singapore MedTech Directory
 Singapore Builders Directory
 Singapore Source Book for Architects, Designers & Building Contractors
 Directory of Singapore Process & Chemicals Industries
 Singapore Specialty Chemicals Guide
 Singapore Electronics Industry Directory
 Singapore Environmental Industry Directory
 Times Business Directory of Singapore
 Singapore Halal Industry Directory
 Singapore Airfreight Directory
 Singapore Maritime Directory
 Singapore Shiprepairing, Shipbuilding & Offshore Industries Directory
 Singapore Sports Guide

Colour Library Books

The now defunct publisher, Colour Library Books Limited of Surrey, produced at least one title the material of which was listed as copyright of Marshall Cavendish.
In The Vicar of Dibley penultimate episode, Geraldine Granger has a copy of the ‘Colour Library Book - Nice & Easy Cookbook’ (1988) next to her chocolate filled Bible.

References

External links

Book publishing companies of Singapore
Publishing companies established in 1968
1968 establishments in the United Kingdom
Singaporean brands